Panchalankurichi is a 1996 Indian Tamil language drama film directed by Seeman starring Prabhu, Madhubala, Chandrasekar, Prasanna, Thulukanam, Vadivelu, Vijayakumar, Ilavarasi, Maheswari.

Plot
Kitaan(Prabhu), as a young child, migrates to paanchalankurichi with his mother (Ilavarasi). When they try to cross a river his mother sacrifices herself to let him live. When he is distraught at the sight of his mother dying, Maayandi Thevar (Vijayakumar (Tamil actor)), the local chieftain, arrives and takes pity on Kitaan and takes him under his wing and raises him like a son. 
 
Kitaan grows up in Paanchalankurichi as a brave young man who is so noble in his acts that the local parents send their unmarried girls to the fairs of other villages with Kitaan as their guardian angel. Kitaan also has a brotherly relationship with Maayandi Thevar's daughter Chinnaatha (Maheswari). At a fair when a few local hooligans, brothers of Kaarisaamy (Mahanadi Shankar) misbehave with girls from Kitaan's village Kitaan fights with the goons to save their honor. 
 
The heroine(Madhoo) upon seeing Kitaan's exploits in the fight and further in the local panchayat's inquest into the fight gets impressed with Kitaan and his qualities. Heroine is the daughter of GeedhariVaagai Chandrasekhar, who is a close acquaintance of Maayandi Thevar in the village. 
 
Kaarisaamy, another local big shot, has locked horns with Maayandi in the past and had incurred some financial losses due to the fact that Maayandi opposes Kaarisaami's nefarious and illegal activists. Kaarisami plots revenge and plans a long game to bring Maayandi and Kitaan down. How Kitaan foils the Kaarisaamy's plan forms the rest of the story 
 
One of Kaarisaamy's brothers Malasaamy is a classmate of Maayandi's daughtet Chinaatha. They fight initially but fall in love. Kaarisaamy plans to use this against Maayandi.

Cast

Soundtrack
Soundtrack was composed by Deva and lyrics were written by Vairamuthu and Seeman. The songs Un Othatora Sivappe and Asai Veithen Became instant hits when Chinna Chinna Panithuli song is inspired from Latin Song 'O fortuna' by Carl Orff.

References 

1996 films
1990s Tamil-language films
Indian drama films
Films scored by Deva (composer)
1996 directorial debut films
Films directed by Seeman